Sancho Lyttle (born September 20, 1983) is a Vincentian-Spanish former professional basketball player for the WNBA. Combining the WNBA and the European season, she has won six domestic leagues and four Euroleague titles with four teams in three countries. She was born in Saint Vincent and the Grenadines and was granted Spanish nationality in June 2010. With the Spanish basketball team she has won four medals between 2010 and 2017.

Early life
Sancho Lyttle was born to Evelyn Little and Ian Cain. Members of her family spell their surname 'Lyttle' or 'Little'. Sancho has a younger brother, Xavier Little. Sancho attended St. Vincent Girls' High School where she played netball and ran various Track and Field events. She never played basketball until prompted to do so after her move to the United States. She and three other girls from her country were requested by her Junior College and current assistant coach for the University of Houston Women's team Wade Scott who offered to teach them how to play the game of basketball.

College career
Sancho Lyttle played collegiate basketball at Clarendon College before transferring to the University of Houston from 2003 to 2005 where she currently holds the record for single season rebound average (2004–2005), offensive rebounds (04-05) and most rebounds in a single season (04-05). She also holds the career record for highest rebounding average.

WNBA career
When the Houston Comets folded in 2008, Lyttle was selected first in the dispersal draft by the Atlanta Dream.

She currently plays the power forward position for the Phoenix Mercury in the WNBA. Over her career, Lyttle has scored 1,505 points, collected 1,041 rebounds, and has 200 assists, 242 steals, and 96 blocks through six seasons. She was the fifth overall draft pick in the 2005 WNBA Draft out of Houston.

In 2010, Lyttle had career highs in points and rebounds with 27 and 20, respectively. She was hospitalized for a number of days in 2010 after being knocked unconscious for a little over a minute by an incidental elbow during a game. Lyttle recovered and played 13 days later.

On February 1, 2018, Lyttle signed with the Phoenix Mercury after spending the previous nine seasons with the Atlanta Dream. However, her season ended early when she tore her ACL on June 30, 2018. In September 2019, Little announced her retirement after 15 WNBA seasons.

WNBA stats

Euroleague career
Simultaneously to her WNBA career, she has played in Spain, Turkey and Russia, winning one Euroleague and at least one domestic league playing for every club. She currently plays for Russian team UMMC Ekaterinburg

Euroleague stats

National team

Lyttle played her first and only tournament with native Saint Vincent and the Grenadines in 2004, at the Caribbean championship.

After her naturalization was granted in 2010, she made her debut with the senior Spanish team in 2010, days after turning 27. Up to 2017, she had 45 caps with 15.6 PPG and 9.5 RPP, participating in two World Championships and three European Championships. After helping the team qualify for the 2016 Olympics in Rio in mid-June, she missed the Games after breaking her toe in mid-July playing for the Atlanta Dream:

  2010 World Championship
 9th 2011 Eurobasket
  2013 Eurobasket (MVP)
  2014 World Championship
  2017 Eurobasket

Awards and achievements
 2009, 2010 WNBA All-Star
 Bronze medal in 2010 FIBA World Championship for Women
 Named to the 2010 FIBA World Championship for Women All-Tournament Team
 Gold medal in EuroBasket Women 2013
 FIBA Europe Women's Player of the Year (2013)
 2014—FIBA World Championship All-Star Five
 Silver medal in 2014 FIBA World Championship for Women

See also
 List of WNBA career rebounding leaders

References

External links
 
 
 

1983 births
Living people
Spanish women's basketball players
Saint Vincent and the Grenadines women's basketball players
Saint Vincent and the Grenadines emigrants to Spain
Centers (basketball)
Power forwards (basketball)
Ros Casares Valencia players
Galatasaray S.K. (women's basketball) players
Houston Comets players
Houston Cougars women's basketball players
Atlanta Dream players
Junior college women's basketball players in the United States
Saint Vincent and the Grenadines expatriate basketball people in Spain
Saint Vincent and the Grenadines expatriate basketball people in the United States
Spanish expatriate basketball people in the United States
Spanish expatriate basketball people in Turkey
Naturalised citizens of Spain
Women's National Basketball Association All-Stars
Saint Vincent and the Grenadines expatriate basketball people in Turkey